Railway Station Pier or Thonburi Railway Station Pier,  with designated pier code N11 is a pier for Chao Phraya Express Boat, that runs between Bangkok (Wat Rajsingkorn next to Asiatique; S3) and the north ends in Nonthaburi Province (Pakkret; N33).

Location
This pier is in the middle between Wang Lang Pier (N10) and Phra Pin Klao Bridge Pier (N12) located in front of Siriraj Piyamaharajkarun Hospital  by the Chao Phraya River near mouth of Bangkok Noi Canal. It is located in the same area that used to be Bangkok Noi Railway Station, hence its name "Railway Station Pier" or "Tha Rot Fai" in Thai.

From this pier, looking across Chao Phraya River can see the Dome Building, the Faculty of Political Science and the Faculty of Economics of Thammasat University clearly.

Railway Station Pier is considered to be a good atmosphere pier, suitable for being a tourist attraction and a promenade for walking along the river, there are also restaurant and cafés available. Because nearby which is the area of Siriraj Piyamaharajkarun Hospital, there is 
Chaloem Phrakiat 72 th year Park with a beautiful Thai-style pavilion located, and there are also old steam locomotive number 950 and the Siriraj Bimuksthan Museum.

In addition to water travel, the entrance of this pier is also a terminal of many songthaew (Thai-style minibus) routes. That ran to many places in Taling Chan District, for example Wat Champa Community, Taling Chan and Khlong Lat Mayom Floating Markets etc.

In August 2018,  the Marine Department ordered temporary suspension of Railway Station Pier service. Because one of the poles of the pontoon was damaged, therefore having to refrain from service for repair.

See more
Siriraj Piyamaharajkarun Hospital
Bangkok Noi Railway Station

References

Chao Phraya Express Boat piers
Bangkok Noi district
Buildings and structures in Bangkok
Piers in Thailand